Dion Harris (born April 27, 1985) is an American former professional basketball player for the Akita Northern Happinets of the Japanese bj league.

High School Special Event statistics

|-
| style="text-align:left;"| 2003
| style="text-align:left;"| Jordan Classic
| 1 ||  || 22.0 || .556 || .500 || .500|| 7.0 ||2.0 || 2.0 ||0.0 || 14.0
|-

Prep/High School Awards & Honors
Parade All-American Second Team – 2003
Michigan Mr. Basketball – 2003

College statistics

|-
| style="text-align:left;"| 2003–04
| style="text-align:left;"| Michigan
| 34 || 11 || 28.1 || .393 || .341 || .772|| 2.2 ||2.2 || 1.0 ||0.1 || 10.1
|-
| style="text-align:left;"| 2004–05
| style="text-align:left;"| Michigan
| 31 || 30 || 36.5 || .365 || .333 || .755|| 2.8 ||3.5  || 1.1 || 0.2 || 14.3
|-
| style="text-align:left;"| 2005–06
| style="text-align:left;"| Michigan
| 31 || 23 || 31.2 || .403 || .390 || .821|| 2.9 ||2.8  || 0.69|| 0.1 || 11.1
|-
| style="text-align:left;"| 2006–07
| style="text-align:left;"| Michigan
| 35 || 33 || 32.8 || .375 || .358 || .858|| 2.1 ||3.6 || 1.1 || 0.1 || 13.4
|-
|- class="sortbottom"
! style="text-align:center;" colspan=2| Career
! 131 || 97 || 32.1 || .382 || .355 || .804 || 2.5 ||3.0 ||1.0 || 0.1 || 12.2

NCAA Awards & Honors
All-Big Ten Third Team (Coaches) – 2007
All-Big Ten Honorable Mention (Coaches) – 2005
All-Big Ten Third Team (Media) – 2007
All-Big Ten Honorable Mention (Media) – 2005
All-Big Ten Freshman Team – 2004

Career statistics

Regular season 

|-
| align="left" | 2007–08
| align="left" | Świecie
|24 ||  || 26.2 ||.360  || .329 ||.718  || 1.8 || 1.7 || 1.4||1.1  ||7.8
|-
| align="left" | 2011–12
| align="left" | TSV
|14 ||  || 31.9 ||.424  || .376 ||.892  || 2.7 || 2.1 || 0.6||0.3  ||16.2
|-
| align="left" | 2011–12
| align="left" | Gigantes
|2 || 1 || 24.9 ||.500  || .500 ||.000  || 3.00 || 1.50 || 1.00 ||0.00  ||10.0
|-
| align="left" | 2012–13
| align="left" | Akita
|51 ||  || 26.0 ||.375  || .313 ||.673  || 3.4 || 3.0 || 0.9 ||0.2  ||13.7 
|-
| align="left" | 2014–15
| align="left" | Telecom
|18 || 16 || 30.7 ||.394  || .345 ||.808  ||4.22 || 2.17 || 0.56 ||0.22  ||18.22 
|-

Playoffs 

|-
|style="text-align:left;"|2007–08
|style="text-align:left;"|Swiecie 
| 16 ||  || 13.3 || .321 || .308 || .667 || 0.9 || 0.8 || 0.4 || 0.6 || 1.6
|-
|style="text-align:left;"|2011–12
|style="text-align:left;"|TSV
| 3 ||  || 26.3 || .250 || .176 || .900 || 1.0 || 1.0 || 0.7 || 0.7 || 9.3
|-

References

External links
Akita vs Miyazaki
Dion Harris on Youtube
Michigan vs. Notre Dame: Dion Harris' NIT Game-Winner

1985 births
Living people
Akita Northern Happinets players
American expatriate basketball people in Colombia
American expatriate basketball people in Cyprus
American expatriate basketball people in Germany
American expatriate basketball people in Japan
American expatriate basketball people in Venezuela
Basketball players from Detroit
Michigan Wolverines men's basketball players
American men's basketball players
Guards (basketball)
Redford High School alumni